Ignazio Porro (25 November 1801 – 8 October 1875) was an Italian inventor of optical instruments.

Porro's name is most closely associated with the prism system which he invented around 1850 and which is used in the construction of Porro prism binoculars.

He also developed a strip camera in 1853 for mapping, which was one of the earliest such.

References

Works

External links
 Biography of Ignazio Porro at the FSU Molecular Expressions website
Information about Porro at the Carl Zeiss website

1801 births
1875 deaths
19th-century Italian inventors
Lens designers
Optical engineers
Italian topographers